Ludhiana Junction railway station (station code: LDH) is a railway station located in Ludhiana district in the Indian state of Punjab and serves Ludhiana. It is located in about the centre of the city and is among the busiest railway stations of Punjab. It is also among the cleanest of railway stations of India.

The railway station

History
The Scinde, Punjab & Delhi Railway completed the -long –Ambala Cantt – –– line in 1870 connecting Multan (now in Pakistan) with Delhi.

The Ludhiana–Jakhal line was laid in 1901, possibly by the Southern Punjab Railway Co.

The extension from the Macleodganj (later renamed Mandi Sadiqganj and now in Pakistan) railway line to Ludhiana was opened by the Southern Punjab Railway Company in 1905.

The – rail link (also referred to as Ludhiana–Chandigarh rail link) was inaugurated in 2013.

Electrification
The Mandi Gobindgarh-Ludhiana sector was electrified in 1996–97.

Loco sheds
Ludhiana Diesel Loco Shed holds 184+ locos including WDM-2, WDM-3A and WDG-3A/WDG-4D. Ludhiana Electric Loco Shed was commissioned in 2001 and houses WAG-5 (now transferred to other sheds), WAG-7, WAG-9 and WAP-4 (now transferred to TKD DLS) locos.

Passenger movement
Ludhiana is amongst the top hundred booking stations of Indian Railways.

References

External links
Trains at Ludhiana

Railway stations in Ludhiana district
Firozpur railway division
Transport in Ludhiana
1870 establishments in India